Temnostoma is a genus of hoverflies. The larvae of some species feed on the wood of deciduous trees.

Species
Temnostoma albostriatum Huo, Ren & Zheng, 2007
Temnostoma altaicum Krivosheina, 2004
Temnostoma alternans Loew, 1864
Temnostoma angustistriatum Krivosheina, 2002
Temnostoma apiforme (Fabricius, 1794)
Temnostoma arciforma He & Chu, 1995
Temnostoma balyras (Walker, 1849)
Temnostoma barberi Curran, 1939
Temnostoma bombylans (Fabricius, 1805)
Temnostoma daochus (Walker, 1849)
Temnostoma excentricum Harris, 1841
Temnostoma flavidistriatum Huo, Ren & Zheng, 2007
Temnostoma fumosum Hull, 1944
Temnostoma jozankeanum (Matsumura, 1916)
Temnostoma nigrimanus Brunetti, 1915
Temnostoma ningshanensis Huo, Ren & Zheng, 2007
Temnostoma obscurum Loew, 1864
Temnostoma pallidum Sack, 1910
Temnostoma pauperius Speiser, 1924
Temnostoma ravicauda He & Chu, 1995
Temnostoma ruptizona Cheng, 2012
Temnostoma sacki fossil  Stats, 1940 
Temnostoma taiwanum Shiraki, 1930
Temnostoma trifasciatum Robertson, 1901
Temnostoma tuwense Krivosheina, 2004
Temnostoma venustum Williston, 1887
Temnostoma vespiforme (Linnaeus, 1758)

References

The Ecology of Commanster

Diptera of Europe
Diptera of Asia
Diptera of North America
Eristalinae
Hoverfly genera
Taxa named by Amédée Louis Michel le Peletier
Taxa named by Jean Guillaume Audinet-Serville